Malanpu railway station is a small railway station in Bhind district, Madhya Pradesh. Its code is MLAR. It serves Industrial Area of Malanpur. The station consists of two platforms. The platforms are not well sheltered. It lacks many facilities including water and sanitation.

Major trains

 Indore–Bhind Express
 Jhansi–Gwalior–Etawah Link Express

References

Jhansi railway division
Railway stations in Bhind district